SM UB-120 was a German Type UB III submarine or U-boat in the German Imperial Navy during World War I. She was commissioned into the German Imperial Navy on 23 March 1918 as SM UB-120.

UB-120 was surrendered to the British on 24 November 1918 in accordance with the requirements of the Armistice with Germany. She was broken up in Swansea in 1922

Construction

She was built by AG Weser of Bremen and following just under a year of construction, launched at Bremen on 23 February 1918. UB-120 was commissioned later the same year under the command of Oblt.z.S. Richard Plum. Like all Type UB III submarines, UB-120 carried 10 torpedoes and was armed with a  deck gun. UB-120 had a displacement of  while surfaced and  when submerged. Her engines enabled her to travel at  when surfaced and  when submerged.

Summary of raiding history

References

Notes

Citations

Bibliography 

 

German Type UB III submarines
World War I submarines of Germany
U-boats commissioned in 1918
1918 ships
Ships built in Bremen (state)